Ha*Ash: En Vivo is the first live concert DVD and second live album by American Latin pop duo Ha*Ash. It was released through Sony Music Latin and OCESA Seitrack on December 6, 2019 as a digital download. It was filmed at the Auditorio Nacional in Mexico City, on November 11, 2018 during their world tour Gira 100 años contigo. It features guest appearances from American singer Prince Royce on "100 Años", musician Miguel Bosé on "Si Tu No Vuelves" and Spanish singer Melendi on "Destino o Casualidad".

Background and  development 

To support 30 de Febrero (2017), Ha*Ash embarked on a worldwide concert Gira 100 años contigo. The tour was announced by Ha*Ash on their social media in November 2017. On January 13, 2018 the concert tour was confirmed and it began on February 24, 2018. The tour continued in the Auditorio Nacional of Mexico City with 3 shows.

The setlist includes songs of the new album but also older singles from Ha*Ash (2003), Mundos Opuestos (2005), Habitación Doble (2008), A Tiempo (2011) and Primera Fila: Hecho Realidad (2014). The tour included South America, North America and Europe. The show in Auditorio Nacional, Mexico City on November 11, 2018 was filmed and was released as a CD/DVD.

Release and promotion 
The intention to release a live DVD from the tour Gira 100 años contigo was first announced in the TV Program Cuéntamelo ya!  on September 6, 2018, in which the band's singer, Hanna Nicole, reported that the concert in Mexico, was being filmed for a DVD release. The release date, title and artwork were disclosed on November 26, 2019. The album preorders beginning on November 28, 2019 in Apple Music and Spotify. On November 29, 2019, there was a sweepstakes to win tickets to an exclusive screening of the film. It was released worldwide as a digital download on December 6, 2019. In Mexico, the standard edition of the album was released exclusively at Mixup Music Store on December 6, 2019. In Spain the album it was made released on January 3, 2020.

Singles 
"Si tú no vuelves" with Miguel Bosé was released as the lead single in December and peaked at number 1 on the Monitor Latino in Mexico.

Commercial performance 
The album, in its opening week, debuted at number one on the AMPROFON chart in Mexico.

Concert synopsis 

The show opened with Felix y Gil performing two of their songs. As they finished their performance, the backdrops started displaying Ha*Ash's images from her music videos. The band came into focus, and the music started. They appeared from the back of the theater performing "Estés Donde Estés" and "¿De Dónde Sacas Eso?". They greeted the audience and made their way towards the stage as they continued to perform. On stage, Ha*Ash sang "Amor a Medias". Next, they performed "Ojalá" and interacted with the audience. "Todo No Fue Suficiente", "¿Qué Me Faltó?" and "Sé Que Te Vas" are performed afterwards as part of the medley. Later on, Ha*Ash performed "Destino o Casualidad" with singer-songwriter Melendi.

Afterwards, Ha*Ash sang the Primera Fila: Hecho Realidad album track "Dos Copas de Más" and the third single from 30 de Febrero, "Eso No Va a Suceder". They finished the performance and disappeared behind the wings for a costume change. During the intermediate bridge, her band played instrumental versions of the songs "¿Qué Hare Con Este Amor?" and "Esta Mujer". The next segment started with the third single from Mundos Opuestos, "¿Qué Hago Yo?" The performance was followed by the song "Me Entrego a Ti", "No Pasa Nada" and "Te Dejo en Libertad". Ha*Ash continues with a performance of "Si tú no vuelves" with Panamanian-born Spanish Miguel Bosé.

As the show drew to a close, Ha*Ash performed "Ex de Verdad" and Odio Amarte". Later on, American artist Prince Royce joined Ha*Ash on stage for a live rendition of 100 Años". The second act concluded with Ha*Ash performing "Lo Aprendí de Ti" and "No Te Quiero Nada" and they disappeared behind the wings for a costume change. They appeared onstage with Mexican soccer jerseys, to perform "Perdón, Perdón" and "30 de Febrero"which is accompanied by a sing-along with the audience and confetti and white balloons falling from above. They then exited the stage after thanking the audience for their presence.

Track listing

Formats
CD and DVD – Digipak case edition containing three discs: DVD of the concert and two CD containing 22 live tracks.
Digital download and streaming;– contains the 22 tracks from the CD release.

Credits and personnel 
Credits adapted from the liner notes of the Mexican edition of En Vivo.

Musicians

Ashley Grace – lead vocals , guitar 
Hanna Nicole – lead vocals , guitar , electric guitar , harmonica , keyboards 
Miguel Bosé – lead vocals 
Melendi – lead vocals 
Prince Royce – lead vocals 
 Mateo Aguilar Uscanga: keyboards 
 Gerardo "Tito" Ruelas: guitar 
 Fernando Ruiz: bass 
 Ricardo Cortéz: drums 
 Rodrigo "Oso" Duarte: multi-instrumentalist , cello 
 Omar Álvarez Martínez: violin 
 Margie Espinales Correa: violin 
 Arnoldo Cabrera: violin 
 Andrea Alvarado Troncoso: viola

Production

 Roberto Contreras: production manager
 Alain Coorthout: concert design
 Stephanie Rudamn: tour manager
 Bernardo García Salgado: community manager
 Oscar Tobar: monitor engineer (Ha*Ash)
 Luis Román: monitor engineer (Ha*Ash),  room engineer
 Goofy: lighting engineer
 Luis López: stage manager
 Fernando Aponte: stage
 Carlos García stage
 Celso Moreno: backline
 Miguel Tapia: room engineer (Miguel Bosé)
 Ángel Magro: monitor engineer (Miguel Bosé)
 Javier López: recording engineer (Miguel Bosé)

Administration and video credits 

 Gonzalo Ferrari: direction
 Miguel Tafich: realization
 Alberto Montiel: realization
 Carolina González: realization
 Héctor González: assistant director
 Karen Campos: realization assistant
 Sofía López: realization assistant
 Patricio Tamés: realization assistant
 Jordy Alcérreca: Manager Ocesa Seitrack
 Octavio Padilla: show Crew Ha*Ash
 Alex Mizrahi: show Crew Ha*Ash
 Javier Montemayor: show Crew Ha*Ash
 Enrique García: show Crew Ha*Ash
 Gerard Angulo: changing rooms
 Óscar Trapero: security

Design

 Chino Lemus: album Artwork photographer
 Quique Ollervides: graphic and logo design
 Guillermo Gutiérrez: A&R
 Charlie García: A&R

Charts

Release history

References

External links 
 ha-ash.com

Ha*Ash live albums
Ha*Ash video albums
2019 video albums
2019 live albums
Live video albums
Spanish-language live albums
Spanish-language video albums
Sony Music Latin live albums
Sony Music Latin video albums